Georgina King Lewis (1847 to 1924) was described as a "Friend of the Oppressed". She followed in the grand tradition of philanthropic Victorian Quakers, leaving an important legacy in Croydon, South London, England. She was a member of the Stoughton family; her father was a Congregationalist preacher, her brother the Stoughton of Hodder & Stoughton, the publishing house.

To quote her obituary in the Croydon Advertiser, December 13, 1924, Mrs. King Lewis left behind "the practical results and inspiring memory of a wonderful life of discriminating service for others."

As well as her involvement with the first Ruskin House, to which she donated £1,200 of her own money, and the Temperance movement, "she had been on missions of war-time succour to Boers and Bulgars, and in furtherance of anti-slavery had helped to move Governments, as well as privately interviewing Pope Pius X."

Her work with the needy began with the cabmen of Ealing, where she helped to build a Mission Hall. It was when she was 54 that she felt a calling to leave Britain for the concentration camps of South Africa, where she endured spartan conditions with the Boer women and children.

Her belief in God and temperance never faltered. But when she died, aged 77, "her body was worn out." Her funeral was attended by councillors and clergy, and representatives of Ruskin House.

1847 births
1924 deaths
People from Croydon